Fortino Tenaglia Lighthouse is an active lighthouse located on a promontory on the west side of the Gulf of Pozzuoli in the municipality of Bacoli, Campania on the Tyrrhenian Sea.

Description
The first lighthouse was established in 1856 under the Kingdom of the Two Sicilies while the current date back to the post-war period. The lighthouse is completely automated and powered by a solar unit and operated by the Marina Militare with the identification code number 2406 E.F.

See also
 List of lighthouses in Italy
 Bacoli

References

External links

 Servizio Fari Marina Militare

Lighthouses in Italy